Bjørn Hjelmborg  (25 January 1911 – 1994) was a Danish composer and organist.

See also
List of Danish composers

References
This article was initially translated from the Danish Wikipedia.

Male composers
Danish classical organists
Danish music historians
Male classical organists
1911 births
1994 deaths
20th-century classical musicians
20th-century Danish composers
20th-century organists
20th-century Danish male musicians